Richard H. Graham is the third bishop of the Metropolitan Washington, D.C. Synod of the Evangelical Lutheran Church in America. He was elected bishop on June 8, 2007, by the 2007 Synod Assembly. He was re-elected Bishop on June 21, 2013, by the 2013 Synod Assembly. He retired effective September 1, 2019.

External links
Biography on Synod Website

Year of birth missing (living people)
Living people
Evangelical Lutheran Church in America bishops
21st-century Lutheran bishops
21st-century American clergy